Igor Fesunenko (28 January 1933, Orenburg, RSFSR, Soviet Union – 28 April 2016, Moscow, Russia) was a Soviet and Russian journalist, foreign affairs writer, and teacher at the MGIMO.

Biography 
Father Sergey Fesunenko worked as a chief mechanic at the Zaporozhye aluminum plant, the whole family moved there when the war broke out, they were evacuated to the Urals aluminum plant, and there my father worked in the production of aluminum for aircraft.
Mother Evdokia Ivanovna graduated from law school Fesunenko in Irkutsk, was a housewife, in 1944 returned to his father in Kiev on recovery plant.

He was born in Orenburg, spent his childhood in Moscow and Zaporozhye, during the war he lived in the Urals.  In 1955, he graduated from the Moscow Historical Archives Institute,  historian and archivist.  The next two years he served in the Soviet Army. From 1957 to 1963 he worked in godv Main Archive Department. Freelance collaborated with the Komsomolskaya Pravda  and Broadcaster of the USSR, which in 1963 became a member of the Latin American edition (Fesunenko at that time owned by the Spanish). He was sent to Brazil, where he studied Portuguese.

Since 1966 —   correspondent of Television in the Soviet Union in the countries of South America (news bureau in Rio de Janeiro)

In 1971 he returned to the USSR. From 1973 to 1975   the correspondent of Radio and Television of the USSR, Cuba. From 1975 to 1979 he worked in Portugal. He then worked as a political columnist and host of such programs as  Today in the World,   The Camera Looks Into the World,  International Panorama, Vremya. In the early 1990s, he worked in Italy. In the 1990s, led to the transfer of  Mayak, ORT, in the 2000s — on Channel 5 (Petersburg) after the return of the canal to the federal air.

Award
He was awarded the   Order of the Badge of Honour,  Medal For Distinguished Labour is the title of   Honorary Radio Operator. It is known for numerous books on football theme. He is a fan of the football club   Botafogo (Rio de Janeiro)  and  CSKA (Moscow).

References

External links
 Igor Fesunenko interview

1933 births
2016 deaths
Soviet journalists
Russian male journalists
Russian journalists
Soviet sports journalists
Russian sports journalists
Soviet television presenters
Russian radio personalities
Soviet writers
Russian television presenters
People from Orenburg
People from Moscow
People from Zaporizhzhia
Burials in Troyekurovskoye Cemetery
20th-century Russian male writers